Cittarium is a genus of a sea snails, a marine gastropod mollusk in the family Tegulidae.

Species 
There are two species in the genus Cittarium:
 † Cittarium maestratii Lozouet, 2002
 Cittarium pica (Linnaeus, 1758)

References

 Williams S.T., Karube S. & Ozawa T. (2008) Molecular systematics of Vetigastropoda: Trochidae, Turbinidae and Trochoidea redefined. Zoologica Scripta 37: 483–506.

External links
 Philippi, R. A. (1847). Versuch einer systematischen Eintheilung des Geschlechtes Trochus. Zeitschrift für Malakozoologie. 4: 3-11, 17-26
 Montfort P. [Denys de. (1808-1810). Conchyliologie systématique et classification méthodique des coquilles. Paris: Schoell. Vol. 1: pp. lxxxvii + 409 [1808]. Vol. 2: pp. 676 + 16]

 
Tegulidae

ceb:Cittarium
sv:Cittarium
war:Cittarium